S.P. Bhayankar is a 1984 Telugu-language thriller film, produced and directed by V. B. Rajendra Prasad under his Jagapathi Art Pictures banner. It stars Akkineni Nageswara Rao, Krishnam Raju, Sridevi and Vijayashanti, with music composed by K. V. Mahadevan. The film is a remake of the Malayalam film Post Mortem (1982).

Plot

The film begins in a town where Father James a Catholic Priest is adored by everyone. George Bhayankar is a justice-seeking ruffian who defies violations against the poor and Father always tries to mitigate him. Once, Bhayankar disputes with Parishudham a millionaire and head of the town. Bhayankar’s sister Mary loves Johnny the son of Parishudham. Since Bhayankar is anti-rich & ferocious Mary takes Father’s help. Meanwhile, Johnny leaves abroad when Mary becomes pregnant and confesses to Father. Then he promises to find a solution, but the conversation is overheard and misinterpreted by Bhayankar’s love interest Lakshmi. She divulges to Bhayankar that Father is responsible for the deed. So, he revolts against him, and gets arrested but succeeds in absconding. The next day, the public is startled to see Mary’s dead body hanging from a tree. Assuming it is a suicide they bury the corpse without a postmortem. However, Father suspects something fishy, so, he approaches his twin S.P. John Yugandhar a sheer cop to perform the postmortem and he exhumes Mary's coffin. Here as a flabbergast, he finds Father James' dead body in it. Thereupon, Bhayankar is supposed as the culprit, and S.P. immediately begins an investigation to break the mystery behind missing Mary's dead body and Father's death. In that process, S.P. & Bhayankar encounter and move pawns on each other. During that time, Bhayankar learns the actuality through Mary’s friend Mumtaz and repents. Parallelly, S.P. horrifies everybody in the guise of Father’s ghost to uncover the real victim. In their trials, S.P. & Bhayankar spot seized Johnny and he reveals that Mary's death is not suicide, it's a murder. At that same time, a man in veil shoots which misfires and Johnny died. Shockingly, he turns to Parishudham who killed Mary as he detests knitting her with his son. Afterward, due to fear of postmortem he seeks to dispose of the body which is witnessed by Father, therefore, he slaughtered him too. Finally, the movie ends with S.P. & Bhayankar ceasing Parishudham.

Cast

Akkineni Nageswara Rao as Father James & S.P. John Yugandhar (dual role)
Krishnam Raju as George Bhayankar
Sridevi as Devi
Vijayashanti as Lakshmi
Suresh as Johnny
Gollapudi Maruti Rao
Rallapalli as Mohammad
P. L. Narayana
Hema Sundar as Parishudam
Jeeva as Chinna
Geetha as Mary
Rama Prabha as Ankhamma
Samyuktha as Mumtaz
Silk Smitha as item number
Dubbing Janaki

Crew
Art: S. Krishna Rao
Choreography: Prakash
Fights: Madhavan
Dialogues - Lyrics: Acharya Aatreya
Playback: S. P. Balasubrahmanyam, P. Susheela
Music: K. V. Mahadevan
Story- Screenplay: Pushparajan
Editing:  A. Sanjeevi
Cinematography: S. Navanth
Producer - Director: V. B. Rajendra Prasad
Banner: Jagapathi Art Pictures
Release Date: 1 May 1985

Soundtrack

Music composed by K. V. Mahadevan. Lyrics were written by Acharya Aatreya.

References

External links 
 

1980s Telugu-language films
Indian mystery thriller films
1980s mystery thriller films
Films scored by K. V. Mahadevan
Telugu remakes of Malayalam films
Films directed by V. B. Rajendra Prasad